Pterostylis tristis, commonly known as the midget greenhood, is a species of greenhood orchid endemic to New Zealand. Both flowering and non-flowering plants have a rosette of fleshy leaves lying flat on the ground and flowering plants have up to eight yellowish-green or brownish flowers with pale stripes.

Description
Pterostylis tristis is a terrestrial, perennial, deciduous, herb with an underground tuber. The rosette leaves are usually withered by flowering time. The dorsal sepal and petals are fused, forming a hood or "galea" over the column. The lateral sepals are downturned and joined together for most of their length, each with a short point on its end. The labellum is short, broad and blunt with a smooth lobe on the upper end. Flowering occurs from September to January.

Taxonomy and naming
Pterostylis tristis was first formally described in 1886 by William Colenso from a specimen collected on the south bank of the Waipawa River. The description was published in Transactions and Proceedings of the New Zealand Institute. The specific epithet (tristis) is a Latin word meaning "sad". (Colenso described the type specimen as "very small, rather dingy-looking".)

Distribution and habitat
The midget greenhood usually grows in open tussock grassland. It occurs on the South Island east of the main ranges south from the Canterbury region. There are a few old records from the North Island and Stewart Island.

References

tristis
Orchids of New Zealand
Plants described in 1886